National Highway 548, commonly called NH 548 is a national highway in  India. It is a spur road of National Highway 48. NH-548 traverses the state of Maharashtra in India. It is the shortest national highway in India.

Route
Kalamboli - Junction with NH348.

Junctions  

 Terminal near Kalamboli.
 Terminal at Km 5.67.

See also 
 List of National Highways in India
 List of National Highways in India by state

References

External links 

 NH 548 on OpenStreetMap

National highways in India
National Highways in Maharashtra